Cinderella is a 1955 West German family film directed by Fritz Genschow and starring Rita-Maria Nowotny, Renée Stobrawa and Werner Stock.

Plot
In a faraway kingdom, a beautiful young girl, Margaret, lives with her mean stepmother and two spoiled stepsisters. The Prince of the kingdom throws a ball to find a wife. Margaret wants to attend, but her family thinks her too ugly and stupid, calling her a mere “Cinderella”. A Good Fairy, however, intervenes, and provides Margaret with the means to attend the Prince’s Ball. The Prince, of course, is enthralled upon meeting Margaret, for she is the only woman in the kingdom who possesses the spiritual bounty of inner beauty. Margaret runs away from the Prince before he can announce his intentions, however; she leaves behind only her slipper. The Prince searches the kingdom for the tiny foot which fits the slipper; some women even go so far as to mutilate their big feet to try and fool the Prince. The Prince eventually finds Margaret, and asks her to be his “Cinderella.” A big wedding follows, and the fairy tale couple live happily ever after.

Background 
Filming took place from July 11, 1955 to August 8, 1955 in the studio in Berlin-Wannsee. The prince's castle is on Peacock Island. Other outdoor shots were taken at Charlottenburg Palace, Grunewald hunting lodge, in the Glienicke Volkspark and at the Immanuel Hospital. Waldemar Volkmer created the film sets, producer, director and author Fritz Genschow was also the production manager.

Cast
 Rita-Maria Nowotny as Aschenputtel / Cinderella
 Renée Stobrawa as Gute Fee / Fairy Godmother
 Änne Bruck as Stiefmutter / Stepmother
 Renate Fischer as Stiefschwester
 Fritz Genschow as Der Vater / Father
 Rüdiger Lichti as Der Prinz / Prince
 Werner Stock
 Herbert Weissbach
 Joachim Rödel
 Gisela Schauroth
 Erika Petrick
 Anni Marle
 Ali Wonka
 Regine Birkner
 Henning Schlüter
 Jugendchor der Hochschule für Musik as Jugendchor
 Maria Axt as Stiefschwester

References

Bibliography 
 Jack Zipes. The Enchanted Screen: The Unknown History of Fairy-Tale Films. Routledge, 2011.

External links 
 

1955 films
West German films
1950s German-language films
Films directed by Fritz Genschow
German children's films
Films based on Cinderella
Films based on Charles Perrault's Cinderella
1950s German films